Mezőség dance is a form of dance performed by the ethnic Hungarian inhabitants from the Transylvanian Plain.  This improvisational couple dance, known as the mezőségi (meaning "from Mezőség" in Hungarian) has two parts: lassú (slow) and sebes (fast).  Different villages within Mezőség have their own variations of the dance. Mezőségi is one of the most popular dances done at Táncház.

Hungarian dances